Route 223 is a collector road in the Canadian province of Nova Scotia.

It is located on Cape Breton Island and runs from Leitches Creek Station at Route 305 to North Side Whycocomagh Bay at Highway 105.

The highway crosses Bras d'Or Lake twice, first at the Barra Strait where the Barra Strait Bridge links Iona and Grand Narrows (until 1993 this was served by a ferry), and then at St. Patrick's Channel using the Little Narrows cable ferry.

Communities
North Side Whycocomagh Bay
Little Narrows
Ottawa Brook
Jamesville
Iona
Grand Narrows
Christmas Island
Big Brook
Big Beach
Shunacadie
Glasgow
Cross Point
Beaver Cove
Boisdale
Ironville
Leitches Creek
Leitches Creek Station

Parks
 MacCormack Provincial Park
 Barachois Provincial Park

History

The entirety Collector Highway 223 was once designated as Trunk Highway 23.

See also
List of Nova Scotia provincial highways

References

Roads in the Cape Breton Regional Municipality
Roads in Victoria County, Nova Scotia
Roads in Inverness County, Nova Scotia
Nova Scotia provincial highways